Thom Barry is an American former actor who was born in Cleveland, Ohio.  In the 1980s, he was a disc jockey for WUBE-FM in Cincinnati.  He appeared in television advertisements for The Home Depot, Sears, and United Parcel Service, and did voice acting for the TV series The Incredible Hulk and The Wild Thornberrys.  In 2014, The Hollywood Reporter described the actor as best known for playing Detective Will Jeffries on the TV series Cold Case.

Acting credits

Television

Film

References

External links
 

American DJs
American male film actors
American male television actors
American male voice actors
living people
male actors from Cleveland
year of birth missing (living people)